Roberto Rodrigo Cartes Contreras (born 6 September 1972) is a former Chilean footballer that his last club was Lota Schwager of Coronel that played in the Primera B during that moment.

International career
Fuentes made 7 appearances for Chile in 1999. In addition, he played for Chile B against England B on February 10, 1998. Chile won by 2-1.

References

External links

1972 births
Living people
People from Concepción, Chile
Chilean footballers
Chilean expatriate footballers
Chile international footballers
C.D. Huachipato footballers
Argentinos Juniors footballers
Gimnasia y Esgrima de Jujuy footballers
Querétaro F.C. footballers
San Luis F.C. players
Atlético Celaya footballers
Tigres UANL footballers
Club Atlético Zacatepec players
Tampico Madero F.C. footballers
Albinegros de Orizaba footballers
Lota Schwager footballers
Chilean Primera División players
Primera B de Chile players
Argentine Primera División players
Liga MX players
Ascenso MX players
Expatriate footballers in Argentina
Chilean expatriate sportspeople in Argentina
Expatriate footballers in Mexico
Chilean expatriate sportspeople in Mexico
Association football midfielders
People from Concepción Province, Chile
People from Biobío Region